The 1990 Ohio State Buckeyes football team represented the Ohio State University in the 1990 NCAA Division I-A football season. The Buckeyes compiled a 7–4–1 record, including the 1990 Liberty Bowl in Memphis, Tennessee, where they lost, 23–11, to the Air Force Falcons.

Schedule

Personnel

Season summary

Texas Tech

at Boston College

USC

Illinois

at Indiana

at Purdue

Minnesota

Northwestern

at Iowa

at Wisconsin

Michigan

Liberty Bowl (vs Air Force)

1991 NFL draftees

Awards and honors
Robert Smith, Big Ten Freshman of the Year

References

Ohio State
Ohio State Buckeyes football seasons
Ohio State Buckeyes football